Matthew James Hocking (born 30 January 1978 in Boston, England) is an English football defender.

Hocking joined Southport late in the January 2007 transfer window, from Conference South outfit Fisher Athletic. After a year and a half with the Sandgrounders, he signed for Gateshead on 18 August 2008. After making 13 starts and seven substitute appearances in total. Hocking was released by Gateshead.

He returned to his home-town of Boston, Lincolnshire and was linked with a return to Boston United. After training with the town's second non-League club, Boston Town. Hocking signed for the Poachers in July 2009. Hocking then went on to play for St Albans City, making his debut in the 3–0 away defeat to Dorchester Town in the FA Trophy First Round on 11 December 2010. He made 10 appearances for St Albans in the Conference South during the 2010–11 season.

In 2012, he was appointed joint manager of Boston Town alongside Ian Dunn. However, the two left the club in October the following year.

References

External links

1978 births
Living people
People from Boston, Lincolnshire
English footballers
Association football central defenders
Sheffield United F.C. players
Hull City A.F.C. players
York City F.C. players
Boston United F.C. players
Stevenage F.C. players
Fisher Athletic F.C. players
Southport F.C. players
Gateshead F.C. players
Boston Town F.C. players
St Albans City F.C. players
English Football League players
National League (English football) players
English football managers
Boston Town F.C. managers